Ashoka Kumar Thakur v. Union of India is an Indian public interest litigation case challenging the conclusion of the Mandal Commission that about 52% of the total population of India belonged to Other Backward Classes classification. The National Sample Survey Organisation had estimated the OBC segment to be 42 per cent.

Facts
In April 2006, the government decided to reserve nearly 27% of seats for students from the OBC segment in institutes of higher learning in India. This would have reduced the seats for a general, unreserved candidate to about 50% (after taking into account other reserved seats). The Indian parliament passed a bill to bring out an amendment in the constitution in this regard. Thakur challenged the validity of the amendments.

The Supreme Court of India in response to the PIL refused to stay the constitutional amendment but issued notice to the government. The government which had faced strong anti reservation protests on its turn stated that the reservation policy would not be implemented until a bill (The Central Educational Institutions (Reservation in Admission) Bill, 2006) introduced in the parliament in August 2006 for this purpose becomes a law. The bill was later approved by the parliament.

The Supreme Court, as an interim measure, stayed the operation of admission to medical and professional institutions for OBC's under the 27% quota category for the year 2007-2008 and directed that all cases (including this one) should be listed for the third week of August for final hearing and disposal on the issue. The Court held that the 1931 census could not be a determinative factor for identifying OBCs for the purpose of providing reservation. However, it clarified that the benefit of reservation for the Scheduled Castes and Scheduled Tribes could not be withheld and the Centre can go ahead with the identification process to determine the backward classes.

On 10 April 2008, the Supreme Court of India upheld the Government's 27% OBC quotas in Government funded institutions. The Court categorically reiterated its prior stand that "Creamy Layer" should be excluded from the ambit of reservation policy and private institutions are also not to be included in. The verdict produced mixed reactions. Several criteria to identify creamy layer has been recommended, which are as follows:

Those with family income above Rs 250,000 a year should be in creamy layer, and excluded from the reservation quota. Also, children of doctors, engineers, chartered accountants, actors, consultants, media professionals, writers, bureaucrats, defence officers of colonel and equivalent rank or higher, high court and Supreme Court judges, all central and state government Class A and B officials. The court has requested Parliament to exclude MPs’ and MLAs’ children, 
too.

Judgement

1. The Constitution (Ninety-Third Amendment) Act, 2005 does not violate the "basic structure" of the Constitution so far as it relates to the state maintained institutions and aided educational institutions. Question whether the Constitution (Ninety-Third Amendment) Act, 2005 would be constitutionally valid or not so far as "private unaided" educational institutions are concerned, is left open to be decided in an appropriate case.

2. "Creamy layer" principle is one of the parameters to identify backward classes. Therefore, principally, the "Creamy layer" principle cannot be applied to STs and SCs, as SCs and STs are separate classes by themselves.

3. Preferably there should be a review after ten years to take note of the change of circumstances.

4. A mere graduation (not technical graduation) or professional deemed to be educationally forward.

5. Principle of exclusion of Creamy layer applicable to OBC's.

6. The Central Government shall examine as to the desirability of fixing a cut off marks in respect of the candidates belonging to the Other Backward Classes (OBCs)to balance reservation with other societal interests and to maintain standards of excellence. This would ensure quality and merit would not suffer. If any seats remain vacant after adopting such norms they shall be filled up by candidates from general categories.

7. So far as determination of backward classes is concerned, a Notification should be issued by the Union of India. This can be done only after exclusion of the Creamy layer for which necessary data must be obtained by the Central Government from the State Governments and Union Territories. Such Notification is open to challenge on the ground of wrongful exclusion or inclusion. Norms must be fixed keeping in view the peculiar features in different States and Union Territories. There has to be proper identification of Other Backward Classes (OBCs.). For identifying backward classes, the Commission set up pursuant to the directions of this Court in Indra Sawhney 1 has to work more effectively and not merely decide applications for inclusion or exclusion of castes.

8. The Parliament should fix a deadline by which time free and compulsory education will have 
reached every child. This must be done within six months, as the right to free and compulsory 
education is perhaps the most important of all the fundamental rights (Art.21 A). For without education, it becomes extremely difficult to exercise other fundamental rights.

9. If material is shown to the Central Government that the Institution deserves to be included in the Schedule (institutes which are excluded from reservations) of The Central Educational Institutions (Reservation in Admission) Act, 2006 (No. 5 of 2007), the Central Government must take an appropriate decision on the basis of materials placed and on examining the concerned issues as to whether Institution deserves to be included in the Schedule of the said act as provided in Sec 4 of the said act.

10. Held that the determination of SEBCs is done not solely based on caste and hence, the identification of SEBCs is not violative of Article 15(1) of the Constitution.

Sources
Supreme Court Judgement Ashoka Kumar Thakur vs. Union of India
Timeline of recent 'quota in education' events
Website for acts passed in Indian Parliament.
The Hindu News Article.
The Hindu News Article.
Rediff.com New Article.

See also

References

Reservation in India
Supreme Court of India cases
2006 in case law